Yule, also Youell, Youle, Youll or Yuill, is a surname generally of British origin. Yule as a name is derived from the pagan festival of the same name, used for those born at Christmas time. 

People with the surname include

 Annie Henrietta Yule (1874–1950), British film financier and breeder of Arabian horses
 Billy Yule (born 1954), sit-in drummer for The Velvet Underground in 1970
 Bob Yule (1920–1953), New Zealand-born fighter pilot of the Royal Air Force during the Battle of Britain and Second World War
 Charles Bampfield Yule (1806–1878), Royal Naval explorer and author
 Sir David Yule, 1st Baronet (1858–1928), Scottish businessman based in India
 David Yule (field hockey) (born 1974), Canadian field hockey player
 Doug Yule (born 1947), American musician and singer, member of The Velvet Underground 19681973
 George Yule (businessman) (1829–1892), Scottish merchant in England and India, fourth President of the Indian National Congress
 George Yule (linguist) (born 1947), British linguist
 Henry Youll (also Youell) (1608), English madrigalist and composer
 Henry Yule (1820–1889), Scottish orientalist
 Ian Yuill (born 1964), Scottish politician
 Jack Youll (1897–1918), English recipient of the Victoria Cross
 Jimmy Yuill (born 1956), Scottish actor
 James B. Yule (1884–1957), American forestry engineer
 Joe Yule (1892–1950), Scottish-American vaudeville comedian, father of Mickey Rooney
 Joe Yule Jr. (1920–2014), birth name of American actor Mickey Rooney
 John Yule (1812–1886), a seigneur and politician in Canada East
 John Yule (botanist) (1762–1827), a Scottish physician and botanist
 John Yule (California politician) (1833–c. 1888), a Scottish-born American politician
 John Clinton Youle (1916–1999), American meteorologist, newspaper editor, and politician
 Michael Youll (born 1939), English cricketer
 Mike Youle (born 1960), British doctor and clinical researcher specializing in HIV treatment
 Oliver Youll (born 1970), English cricketer
 Paul Youll (born 1965), English science fiction artist, twin brother of Stephen
 Paul Yule (photojournalist) (born 1956), British photographer and film maker
 Paul Alan Yule, German archaeologist
 Robert Yuill (1924–2006), Canadian politician
 Stephen Youll (born 1965), English science fiction artist, twin brother of Paul
 Thomas Yule (born 1976), South African-born Scottish weightlifter
 Tom Yule (born 1888), Scottish footballer
 Tommy Yule (born 1953), Scottish footballer
 Udny Yule (1871–1951), Scottish statistician
 Wayne Youle (born 1974), New Zealand artist
 William Yule (psychologist) (born 1940), psychologist and professor of applied child psychology

References

See also 
 Youell Swinney (19171994), American suspected murderer
 Huell
 Yul (disambiguation)
 Yule (disambiguation)
 
 
 

Surnames of British Isles origin
Yule